George Isaac Yap Go (born June 7, 1996) is a Filipino-Chinese professional basketball player for the Terrafirma Dyip of the Philippine Basketball Association (PBA). He is a three-time UAAP champion with the Ateneo Blue Eagles.

Early life and high school career 
Go wasn't interested in basketball at a young age. However, Gian, his brother, forced Isaac to play with him. In grade school, he had minimal playing time on his team. When he moved up to Xavier High School, he became good enough to represent the Philippines in international tournaments. In 2013, he participated in that year's edition of Adidas Nations. He was also picked for the NBTC All-Star High School Game in 2014, which featured the country's high school standouts. He eventually went to Ateneo for college.

College career 
In 2015, Go was part of Ateneo's rookie class that included Aaron Black, Jerie Pingoy, Chibueze Ikeh, and the Nieto brothers Mike and Matt. He could have started playing the previous year, but a shoulder injury kept him out for the whole season. When he joined the team, Coach Tab Balwin put him on a no-rice diet. Since then, he has lost 20 pounds. 

In Season 79, Go scored 15 points and 4 rebounds to lead Ateneo in a win against the UST Growling Tigers, which was his college career-high. For that performance, he was awarded Player of the Week. In the Final Four against the FEU Tamaraws, he scored 12 points and 14 to send Ateneo to the Finals. They lost to the DLSU Green Archers in the Finals that season. 

In Season 80, Go scored 11 points in the first half against to give UST their 5th straight loss. The Eagles would eventually win all but one game (which was against the Archers) in the elimination round. In their Final Four rematch against FEU, Ateneo lost Game 1. But in Game 2, he tied the game with a three-pointer, and the match went on to overtime. In overtime, he grabbed an offensive rebound and made a bank shot while kneeling on the floor, sealing the game 88–84. The win sent Ateneo back to the Finals. In Game 1, he completed a three-point play that sealed the win for Ateneo. The Eagles lost Game 2, but won Game 3 on a clutch triple from Go, giving Ateneo their first championship since 2012. 

As defending champions and Ateneo representing the Philippines in that year's Jones Cup, expectations were high for Ateneo in Season 81. Go played a part in mentoring rookie center Angelo Kouame that season. He scored the most points for Ateneo in a win over the Adamson Soaring Falcons after Adamson beat them in their first match. They beat the UP Fighting Maroons in the Finals.

The following season, Go took a backseat as Ateneo brought in younger rookie big men. Ateneo won its third straight championship that year. At the end of the season, he applied for the PBA Draft.

PBA career 
In the 2019 PBA Draft, Go was selected as the No. 1 overall draft pick by the Columbian Dyip. He was signed ahead of the Governors' Cup restart. He was held scoreless in his PBA debut. Terrafirma failed to qualify for the playoffs that conference.

The following season, during a game against the NorthPort Batang Pier in the Philippine Cup, Go injured his right knee and had to be taken out of the game. He was later diagnosed with a torn anterior cruciate ligament, medial collateral ligament, and meniscus tear. He will be out for the rest of the season.

PBA career statistics 

As of the end of the 2022–23 season

Season-by-season averages 

|-
| align=left | 
| align=left | Terrafirma
| 6 || 12.5 || .462 || .200 || .333 || 2.8 || .2 || .0 || .2 || 4.7
|-
| align=left | 
| align=left | Terrafirma
| 2 || 7.2 || .400 || .333 || .000 || 2.5 || .0 || .5 || .0 || 4.5
|- class="sortbottom"
| style="text-align:center;" colspan="2"|Career
| 8 || 11.2 || .444 || .222 || .250 || 2.8 || .1 || .1 || .1 || 4.6

National team career 
Go first played for the Philippine national team in the 2011 FIBA Asia U-16 Tournament. In 2018, He was named to the "23 for 23" a pool of Gilas Cadets for the 2023 FIBA World Cup. He also played in the 2021 FIBA Asia Cup qualifiers, even serving as team captain during the third window. He was also on the roster for the 2020 FIBA Olympic Qualifying Tournament. 

In non-FIBA tournaments, he has represented the Philippines in the Dubai International Basketball Championship (DIBC) with Mighty Sports, winning it in 2020. As a member of Ateneo, he participated in the 2018 Jones Cup. His best game in that tournament came against Indonesia, with 21 points of 6-of-7 shooting from beyond the arc. Ateneo finished 4th in that tournament.

In 2022, he was on the roster for the 31st Southeast Asian Games in Vietnam. He had 13 points and 12 rebounds in a win against Cambodia. Gilas went on to lose to Indonesia in the finals, settling for a silver medal.

Off the court 
Go is also a writer for the Philippine edition of NBA.com. He also appears on Philippine sports talk shows such as NBA Hype, and The Game. In 2022, he became an analyst for UAAP Season 84.

Notes

References 

1996 births
Living people
Ateneo Blue Eagles men's basketball players
Basketball players from Quezon City
Centers (basketball)
Competitors at the 2021 Southeast Asian Games
Filipino people of Chinese descent
Philippines men's national basketball team players
Power forwards (basketball)
Southeast Asian Games medalists in basketball
Southeast Asian Games silver medalists for the Philippines
Terrafirma Dyip draft picks
Terrafirma Dyip players